Virendra Singh Sirohi (May 5, 1946 - March 2, 2020) was an Indian politician who was the Member of the Uttar Pradesh Legislative Assembly from Bulandshahr. In 2017 Uttar Pradesh Legislative Assembly election, he contested and won as a Bharatiya Janata Party candidate. He was the Revenue minister in the cabinet of Kalyan Singh, Mayawati Ram Prakash Gupta and Rajnath Singh.

References

1946 births
2020 deaths
Members of the Uttar Pradesh Legislative Assembly
Bharatiya Janata Party politicians from Uttar Pradesh
People from Bulandshahr